Vasco Esporte Clube, commonly known as Vasco, was a Brazilian football club based in Aracaju, Sergipe state. They won the Campeonato Sergipano four times.

History
The club was founded on August 15, 1931, as Vasco da Gama Futebol Clube, and changed to its current name in 1946. Vasco won the Campeonato Sergipano in 1944, 1948, 1953, and in 1987.

Achievements

 Campeonato Sergipano:
 Winners (4): 1944, 1948, 1953, 1987

Stadium

Vasco Esporte Clube play their home games at Estádio Lourival Baptista, nicknamed Batistão. The stadium has a maximum capacity of 14,000 people.

References

Association football clubs established in 1931
Football clubs in Sergipe
1931 establishments in Brazil